BlackLine Systems, Inc., is an American enterprise software company that develops cloud-based services designed to automate and control the entire financial close process. The Los Angeles-based company has 11 offices worldwide.

History

BlackLine was founded in 2001 by Therese Tucker, a former CTO at SunGard Treasury Systems. The initial goal was to help customers replace their use of Excel with a suite of accounting software.

The company functioned with no outside funding until 2013 when the private equity firm, Silver Lake Partners invested more than $200 million in the company.

Blackline reached an agreement to form a strategic alliance with the financial consulting firm McGladrey, in 2015. As part of the alliance, the companies began offering a business process as a service (BPaaS) platform.

The company's IPO was October 28, 2016; they're listed on the Nasdaq under the symbol BL.

Runbook acquisition
In September 2016, the company acquired its European competitor, Runbook for $34 million.

Runbook marketed a dashboard software application program for SAP; before it was acquired by Blackline.

The software's "automation of recurring financial processes" adds "visibility and transparency" and strengthens "internal controls and compliance documentation" of data maintained by SAP.

SAP agreement
In 2018 Blackline reached an agreement with SAP for the latter "to resell BlackLine's .. cloud-based finance and accounting solutions" as part of "SAP Solution Extensions."

Rimilia acquisition
In October 2020, the company acquired UK-based accounts receivable automation company Rimilia for $150 million.

Rimilia's cloud-based SaaS platform "uses AI to accurately apply payments to customer's invoices with any ERP system".

Operations
Blackline provides software for more than 3,100 companies including Costco, Netflix, Coca-Cola, JetBlue Airways, Google, Kraft Heinz, Under Armour, Sirius XM Holdings. The company creates enhanced financial controls, in contrast to basic general ledger applications. BlackLine's software manages financial data, reconciles balances from sub-systems, ensures accurate and complete closings, and monitors regulatory controls through a system known as continuous auditing. The company's software is cloud-based, primarily running on the Google Cloud Platform, and meets ISO 27001 standards.

Recognition
BlackLine was ranked number 43 on Forbes Cloud 100 list in October 2016. With its current market cap of $3.5 billion, the company is the largest tech company having a single female founder.

In May 2016, a Gartner Magic Quadrant report on the 10 major financial corporate performance management solutions ranked BlackLine among the top four "Leaders" with Oracle, IBM and Workiva. Additionally, in 2018, Blackline was positioned as a "Leader" again in Gartner's Magic Quadrant but for "Cloud Financial Close Solutions", a new category developed around cloud based financial technologies by Gartner.

In March 2020, Blackline received the SAP North America Award for Partner Excellence for SAP Solution Extension Growth - Cloud.

In June 2020, BlackLine, Inc. has received a 'Top Rated Award' for 2020 from TrustRadius in the category Financial Close.

In 2022, BlackLine Named to First Annual TrustRadius Best Software List, BlackLine Receives Tech Cares Award from TrustRadius for Third Consecutive Year, BlackLine Named to Newsweek’s List of the Top 100 Most Loved Workplaces for 2022 and a lot more.

See also
Robotic process automation

References

Companies established in 2001
Companies based in Los Angeles
Software companies based in California
2001 establishments in California
Companies listed on the Nasdaq
2016 initial public offerings
Software companies of the United States
Cloud applications
Cloud computing providers